Mikkel Jensen (born 21 January 1995) is a Danish footballer, who plays for Holbaek B&I.

Youth career
Jensen joined Brøndby IF from Holbæk B&I at the age of 16. At the end of November 2011, Jensen went on a trial with FC Bayern München. However, wasn't offered a contract and returned to Brøndby.

Club career

FC Nordsjælland
In February 2013, he signed a contract with FC Nordsjælland. It was the idea, that he would start playing with the under-19 team.

Brøndby IF confirmed, that they had offered Jensen a contract extension, but the parts couldn't agree.

In the summer 2014, Jensen was one out of six under-19 players, who permanently was promoted in to the first team squad.

Loan to FC Roskilde
On 2 September 2014, Jensen was loaned out to Danish 1st Division club, FC Roskilde.

Næstved BK
On 8 July 2015, Jensen signed a two-year contract with newly promoted Danish 1st Division club Næstved Boldklub. Jensen got shirt number 12.

Jensen scored his first goal for Næstved on 2 August 2015, in a 1-2 defeat against FC Helsingør. He scored just before the half-break in the 45th minute to 1-1.

Holbæk B&I
On 16 July 2017, Jensen signed for his motherclub Holbæk B&I in the Denmark Series.

References

External links
 Mikkel Jensen on naestvedboldklub.dk
 Mikkel Jensen on Soccerway
 Mikkel Jensen on DBU

1995 births
Living people
Danish men's footballers
Danish Superliga players
Danish 1st Division players
Danish 2nd Division players
FC Nordsjælland players
FC Roskilde players
Denmark youth international footballers
Association football forwards
People from Holbæk Municipality
Holbæk B&I players
Sportspeople from Region Zealand